The canton of Béziers-3 is an administrative division of the Hérault department, southern France. Its borders were modified at the French canton reorganisation which came into effect in March 2015. Its seat is in Béziers.

Composition

It consists of the following communes:
 
Bassan
Béziers (partly)
Boujan-sur-Libron
Cers
Espondeilhan
Lieuran-lès-Béziers
Sauvian
Servian
Villeneuve-lès-Béziers

Councillors

Pictures of the canton

References

Cantons of Hérault